Košarkaški klub Proleter, commonly referred to as KK Proleter Zrenjanin, is a men's professional basketball club based in Zrenjanin, Serbia. They currently participates in the Second Basketball League of Serbia. The club is also known as Proleter Naftagas due to sponsorship reasons. They are the only club in Serbia outside Belgrade which won a national title.

History

Formed in 1947, they immediately became one of the leading clubs in the Yugoslavia. The club was named after Proletariat. In the 1948 season, just one year after its establishment, the club won second place in the national championship. They also finished runners-up in 1952 and 1955, before finally won the national title in the 1956 season. At the time, the club has a notable starting five consisted of players Vilmos Lóczi, Lajos Engler, Dušan Radojčić, Ljubomir Katić, and Milutin Minja.

After more than a decade playing in the lower leagues, the club participated in the Basketball League of Serbia from 2009 to 2012.

Sponsorship naming
KK Proleter has had several denominations through the years due to its sponsorship:

Players

Current roster

Coaches

  Vilmos Lóczi
  Ljubomir Katić
  Dušan Radojčić
  Marijan Novović (1987–1988)
  Kosta Jankov (1994–1995)
  Dragan Nikolić (2006–2007)
  Zoran Todorović (2007–2008)
  Zoran Bajin (2010–2019)
  Stefan Atanacković (2019–present)

Trophies and awards

Trophies

Yugoslav League (defunct)
 Winners (1): 1956
 Runners-up (4): 1948, 1952, 1955, 1957
Second League of Serbia (2nd-tier)
Winner (1): 2016–17

Awards 
Yugoslav League Top Scorer
 Novaković – 1947, 1948
Vilmos Lóczi – 1952

Notable players
  Vilmos Lóczi
  Lajos Engler
  Dušan Radojčić
  Ljubomir Katić
  Milutin Minja
  Dejan Bodiroga
  Luka Pavićević

References

External links
 KK Proleter Zrenjanin at srbijasport.net
 KK Proleter Zrenjanin at eurobasket.com
 

 
Proleter Zrenjanin
Proleter Zrenjanin
Basketball teams established in 1947
Sport in Zrenjanin
1947 establishments in Serbia